9965 GNU, provisional designation , is a background asteroid from the inner regions of the asteroid belt, approximately  in diameter. It was discovered on 5 March 1992, by astronomer of the Spacewatch program at the Kitt Peak National Observatory in Arizona, United States. The uncertain D-type asteroid has a long rotation period of 39.7 hours. It was named for the free-software GNU Project.

Orbit and classification 

GNU is a non-family asteroid from the main belt's background population.

It orbits the Sun in the inner asteroid belt at a distance of 2.0–2.8 AU once every 3 years and 9 months (1,373 days; semi-major axis of 2.42 AU). Its orbit has an eccentricity of 0.17 and an inclination of 12° with respect to the ecliptic.

Physical characteristics 

GNU has been characterized as a dark D-type asteroid by Pan-STARRS survey and in the SDSS-based taxonomy. It is also an assumed S-type asteroid, the most common type in the inner asteroid belt.

Rotation period 

In September and October 2012, two rotational lightcurves of GNU were obtained from photometric observations by astronomers at the Palomar Transient Factory in California. Lightcurve analysis gave a rotation period of 39.720 and 39.745 hours, with a brightness amplitude of 0.36 and 0.42 magnitude in the R- and S-band, respectively. While not being a slow rotator, GNU period is significantly longer than the average spin rate of 2 to 20 hours, seen among the majority of asteroids.

Diameter and albedo 

According to the survey carried out by the NEOWISE mission of NASA's Wide-field Infrared Survey Explorer, GNU measures between 2.07 and 6.293 kilometers in diameter and its surface has an albedo between 0.102 and 0.53. The Collaborative Asteroid Lightcurve Link assumes a standard albedo for a stony asteroid of 0.20 and calculates a diameter of 4.10 kilometers based on an absolute magnitude of 14.3.

Naming 

This minor planet was named for the free-software GNU Project, created by Richard Stallman 1984. GNU is the recursive acronym for "GNU is not Unix". The collaborative projects enables programmers to trade and improve upon free software. The official naming citation was published by the Minor Planet Center on 11 November 2000.

References

External links 
 Asteroid Lightcurve Database (LCDB), query form (info )
 Dictionary of Minor Planet Names, Google books
 Discovery Circumstances: Numbered Minor Planets (5001)-(10000) – Minor Planet Center
 
 

009965
009965
Named minor planets
19920305